The Galera River is a river in the Mato Grosso state in western Brazil.

See also
List of rivers of Mato Grosso

References

External links
Brazilian Ministry of Transport

Rivers of Mato Grosso